Požega may refer to:

 Požega, Croatia, a city in western Slavonia, Croatia
 Požega County, an administrative subdivision of the Kingdom of Croatia-Slavonia from the 12th century to 1920
 Požega, Serbia, a town in Zlatibor district of Serbia
 Požega (Novi Pazar), a village in Raska district of Serbia
 Eparchy of Požega, an Eastern Orthodox eparchy of the Serbian Patriarchate of Peć, during the 16th and 17th century